were first established by the  of 1948. It has since been amended 11 times to add additional holidays, the latest being in 2018, for a total of 16 recognized holidays. 

May 4, sandwiched between Constitution Memorial Day on May 3 and Children's Day on May 5, was an annual example of such a holiday until it was replaced by Greenery Day in 2007.

Although it is not an official holiday, most companies voluntarily designate a holiday from December 29 to January 3, or, depending on the industry, from Christmas Eve to January 5. This case is unique in Asia.

Table of Japanese holidays

Holidays in 2018–24
The national holidays in 2018–2024 are as follows.

Events of imperial mourning and celebration 
In addition to the annual holidays listed above, certain events of celebration or mourning related to the imperial family are also treated as national holidays in the year in which they occur.

There have been six instances of such holidays since the introduction of the Public Holiday Law:
 April 10, 1959: Marriage of Crown Prince Akihito
 February 24, 1989: State Funeral of Emperor Shōwa (Hirohito)
 November 12, 1990: Official Enthronement Ceremony of the Emperor Emeritus (Akihito)
 June 9, 1993: Marriage of Crown Prince Naruhito
 April 30, 2019: Abdication of Emperor Akihito
 October 22, 2019: Official Enthronement Ceremony of the current Emperor (Naruhito)

Recent changes
Beginning in 2000, Japan implemented the Happy Monday System, which moved a number of national holidays to Monday in order to obtain a long weekend.

 Coming-of-Age Day: January 15 → 2nd Monday of January, starting in 2000.
 Marine Day: July 20 → 3rd Monday of July, starting in 2003.
 Respect for the Aged Day: September 15 → 3rd Monday of September, starting in 2003.
 Health and Sports Day: October 10 → 2nd Monday of October, starting in 2000.

In 2006, the country added Shōwa Day, a new national holiday, in place of Greenery Day on April 29, and to move Greenery Day to May 4. These changes took effect in 2007.

In 2014, the House of Councillors decided to add  to the Japanese calendar on August 11, after lobbying by the Japanese Alpine Club. It is intended to coincide with the Bon Festival vacation time, giving Japanese people an opportunity to appreciate Japan's mountains.

With the Japanese imperial transition, the Emperor's Birthday was moved from December 23 to February 23 (the respective birthdays of Emperor Emeritus Akihito and Emperor Naruhito). Due to Akihito's 2019 birthday being after his abdication but Naruhito's before his accession, this holiday was not celebrated in 2019.

As special arrangement for the 2020 Summer Olympics, the 2020 dates for Marine Day, Sports Day, and Mountain Day were moved to July 23, July 24, and August 10 respectively. With the Olympics and Paralympics postponed until 2021 due to the COVID-19 pandemic, the government left this change in place for 2020 and passed an amendment to the Olympic and Paralympic Special Measures Act to make a corresponding change to the holidays in 2021, moving them to July 22, July 23, and August 9 respectively.

See also
 Japanese calendar
 Japanese festivals
 List of Japanese anniversaries and memorial days
 Newspaper holiday (Japan)
 Okinawa Memorial Day

Notes

References

Works cited
 Kōjien, 6th edition

External links
 Japanese Holidays - Japan-Guide.com
 Public holiday law 

 
Japan
Holidays